Harold Frederick Pearson (7 May 1908 – 2 November 1994) was an English footballer who played as a goalkeeper.

Football career
Pearson was born in Tamworth. As a youngster he played football for Glascote United, Glascote Methodists, Belgrave YMCA, Belgrave United, Two Gates F.C., Nuneaton Town and Tamworth Castle. He joined West Bromwich Albion as an amateur in April 1925 and turned professional a month later. His father Hubert Pearson was also a goalkeeper and the two were together on Albion's books until Hubert's retirement in May 1926.

Harold Pearson made his debut in December 1927, in a Division Two match against South Shields. In 1930–31 he helped the club to achieve promotion to the First Division and played in the 1931 FA Cup Final, in which Albion beat Birmingham 2–1. In 1932 he earned his only cap for England, marking the occasion with a clean sheet in a 3–0 win over Scotland at Wembley Stadium.

Pearson kept goal in the 1935 FA Cup Final, but this time earned only a runners-up medal as his team lost 4–2 to Sheffield Wednesday. After making 303 appearances for West Bromwich Albion, he joined Millwall for a £300 transfer fee in August 1937. He remained with Millwall until his retirement in 1940, though he did appear as a guest player for West Ham United later in Second World War.

He died in November 1994 at the age of 86. By then, he was believed to be the oldest surviving former England international.

Notes

A.  Some sources say that he played for Nuneaton Borough, however the team were known as Nuneaton Town at the time Pearson played for them.

References

External links

1908 births
1994 deaths
Sportspeople from Tamworth, Staffordshire
English footballers
England international footballers
Association football goalkeepers
Nuneaton Borough F.C. players
Tamworth F.C. players
West Bromwich Albion F.C. players
Millwall F.C. players
West Ham United F.C. wartime guest players
FA Cup Final players